FC Aldiyer Kurshab is a football club that plays in the Kyrgyzstan League, the top division in Kyrgyzstan.

History 
19??: Founded as FC Aldiyer Kurshab.

Achievements
Kyrgyzstan League: 0
9th place, Zone B: 1998

Kyrgyzstan League Second Level: 1
Winner: 2013

Kyrgyzstan Cup: 0

References

Football clubs in Kyrgyzstan